Belsen can mean:

 Bergen-Belsen concentration camp
 Bergen-Belsen displaced persons camp
 Belsen (Bergen), a small village near Bergen, about 25 km north of Celle in northern Germany. The camps were named after this village.
 Other places:
 Belsen, a suburb of Mössingen in Landkreis Tübingen in Baden-Württemberg, Germany: see :de:Belsen (Mössingen)
 Belsener Kapelle, one of the oldest Romanesque choir tower churches in Baden-Württemberg. It is in Belsen (Mössingen). See :de:Belsener Kapelle
 Belsenberg, a hill 256 meters high near Künzelsau in Baden-Württemberg: see :de:Künzelsau

See also
 Bahlsen, a German food company based in Hanover
 Belses, a village in Scotland
 Bełżec extermination camp and Bełżec town, in Poland
 Bolsena, a place in Italy
 El Bolsón (disambiguation), Spanish place names
 Velsen, a place in the Netherlands
 The surname Abelson
 The surname Bellson